Rambaiyin Kaadhal ( Ramba's love) is a 1939 Indian, Tamil language Hindu mythological film directed by B. N. Rao. The film stars K. Sarangapani and K. L. V. Vasantha. The film has an alternate title Yathbhavishyan. Rambaiyin Kaadhal was remade in 1956 under the same title.

Plot
The story is based on Hindu mythology. Ramba is a dancer in Indra's court. One day she descends to earth to see its beauty. She is enthralled by the riverside scenery in a country. She stays there for a long time and hence gets late for a dance performance in the court. Indra gets angry and curses her to become a statue near that river. Narada takes pity on Ramba and asks Indra to give a remedy. Indra agrees and says that Ramba can rejoin as court dance once she has suffered enough for her penance. In the meantime, an innocent young man, Yathabavishayan, who lives in a village near the river is fooled by his friends. They make him marry a donkey. After celebrations, they leave him. Yathabavishayan falls asleep. Narada arranges the statue (Ramba) to be placed near Yathabavishayan. When the young man gets up, he finds that he was sleeping at the foot of a statue of a woman. While he gets excited about it, the statue comes alive as a young woman. She falls in love with Yathabavishayan and takes him to heaven with her. One day, while in heaven, Yathabavishayan asks her to take him to Yama's Kingdom. He learns the secret of living without the fear of death. Yama finds now he has no work because people on earth has come to know the secret of staying alive. Yama makes inquiry and complaints to Indra that Ramba is responsible from bringing a human being to his (Yama's) Kingdom and taking him back to earth thus, revealing the secret of staying alive without death. Indra curses Ramba to become a ghost. Now Yathabavishayan could not see Ramba. He is mentally affected and wanders about. Ramba realiases that she cannot go back to Indra's court as dancer if she stays as a ghost. She asks Narada to advise her. He tells her a way out. As per that plan, she enters the body of Subashini, the princess of Kasi. The King, Kasi Rajan and his wife, Kasi Rani are baffled by the strange behaviour of the princess. They arrange for a witch doctor to cure her. During the witch doctor's rituals, the wandering Yathabavishayan gets there. Finding him, Ramba, within the body of the princess comes out and goes towards Yathabavishayan. Narada appears to her and advises her that she belongs to the heaven and therefore she should relinquish any love she has towards a human being. She accepts his advice. As she has relinquished her love for an earthly being her status is restored. She tells Yathabavishayan to marry Subashini, the princess. So, Yathabavishayan marries the princess and also inherits her father's Kingdom.

Cast
Cast according to the opening credits of the film

Male cast
 K. Sarangapani  Yathabavishyan
 R. Balasubramanyam  Devendran
 K. A. Chokkalinga Bhagavathar  Naradan
 N. S. Krishnan  Amarasimman
 Professor S. S. Mallaiah  Yaman
 Krishna Sastri  Teacher
 V. S. Srinivasalu Naidu  King of Kasi
 K. S. Jayaraman  Subbani 
 S. Krishnan  Seenu
 S. R. Sudalai  Venkittu
 Rangaraju  Rangan
 Thodi M. Kannan  Chitraguptan
 Kali N. Rathnam  Witch doctor (uncredited)
 T. S. Durairaj  Witch doctor's assistant (uncredited)
 Nagarcoil K. Mahadevan  Sadhu (uncredited)

Female cast
 K. L. V. Vasantha Devi  Rambha
 T. A. Mathuram  Subhashini
 V. Subbulakshmi  Kamu
 Ponnammal  Visalakshi
 Indrani  Queen of Kasi
 T. S. Susheela  Menaka
 Seetha  Oorvasi
 Sarojini  Thilothama

Production
The film was produced by Central Studios and was distributed by Sri Murugan Talkies. B. N. Rao directed the film. Cinematography was by Bodo Gutschwager and the audiography was done by Paul Juraschek. S. Surya was in charge of editing. Art direction was carried out by M. A. Gany. Processing was done at Central Studios by C. A. Sundararajulu, Raghavan Pillai and V. Parthasarathy

This is the first film that T. S. Durairaj featured in where he played an uncredited role as a witch doctor's assistant.

Soundtrack
The actors sang in their own voice. The Central Studios Orchestra provided the background music with S. M. Subbiah Naidu credited as harmonium player.
Orchestra
 K. S. Sivavadivel Pillai – Fiddle
 S. M. Subbaiah – Harmonium
 G. Sundaram – Tabla
 Ranganathan – Flute
 Narayanan – Veenai
 M. S. Saithumiyan - Sarangi

List of songs

Reception
The film was a success at the box office.

References

External links

 - Song by Kali N. Rathnam and T. S. Durairaj
 - Song by Nagarcoil K. Mahadevan

Indian fantasy comedy films
1930s fantasy comedy films
Indian black-and-white films
1939 comedy films
1939 films